Megas Alexandros Orfani Football Club is a Greek football club based in Orfani, Kavala, Greece.

Honours

National
 Greek Football Amateur Cup Winners: 1
 1987–88

Domestic
 Kavala FCA Champions: 4
 1986–87, 1987–88, 1995–96, 2019-20
 Kavala FCA Cup Winners: 3
 1986–87, 1987–88, 1993–94

References

Kavala
Association football clubs established in 1974
1974 establishments in Greece
Gamma Ethniki clubs